Gaming in India may refer to:

Gambling in India, gambling activities in the country of India
Video games in India, other types of electronic games in the country of India